Baban Sport Club, is an Iraqi football team based in Sulaymaniyah, that plays in Iraq Division Two.

History
Baban Club was founded in 2019 in Sulaymaniyah, and they currently have a team that plays in the Kurdistan Premier League as well, and they were a serious team ready to win the local title since their first participation in the local leagues.

See also 
 2020–21 Iraq FA Cup
 2021–22 Iraq FA Cup

References

External links
 Baban SC on Goalzz.com
 Iraq Clubs- Foundation Dates

2019 establishments in Iraq
Association football clubs established in 2019
Football clubs in Sulaymaniyah